Leucoinocybe is a  fungal genus in the family Tricholomataceae. This genus is known to contain 3 species: Leucoinocybe lenta and Leucoinocybe taniae, found in Europe, and Leucoinocybe sulcata found in India.

See also

 List of Tricholomataceae genera

References

Fungi of Europe
Tricholomataceae
Monotypic Agaricales genera
Taxa named by Rolf Singer